Achille Serra may refer to:

Achille Serra (architect), 19th-century Italian architect from Bologna
Achille Serra (politician) (born 1941), Italian politician